Mount Democrat is a high mountain summit in the Mosquito Range of the Rocky Mountains of North America.

Mountain
Mount Democrat is often climbed together with Mount Lincoln and nearby Mount Bross.  For more information on this group of peaks, including access issues, see Mount Lincoln.

Historical names
Republic Mountain
Mount Buckskin
Mount Democrat

See also

List of mountain peaks of Colorado
List of Colorado fourteeners

References

External links

 
Mount Democrat on Summitpost

Mountains of Colorado
Mountains of Lake County, Colorado
Mountains of Park County, Colorado
Pike National Forest
San Isabel National Forest
Fourteeners of Colorado
North American 4000 m summits